Benninkmolen is a smock mill in Doetinchem, Gelderland, Netherlands which was built in 1921 and has been restored to working order. The mill is listed as a Rijksmonument.

History
In 1856, a tower mill was built for B Vels. It was named the Velsmolen. The mill was demolished in 1920 due to its poor condition. The mill was replaced by a smock mill, which used the smock of the Buursinkmolen, Zelhem, Gelderland and machinery from various mills. It had a pair of Patent sails and a pair of Common sails. On 10 August 1925, the mill was severely damaged in a storm. The mill was not repaired, and was used by the local fire brigade for training exercises.

In 1976, the mill was sold to the Gemeente Doetinchem. The mill was restored in 1980. Its name was changed from Velsmolen to Benninkmolen, after its first owner, J F Bennink. On restoration, the Patent sails were replaced by Common sails. Benninkmolen is listed as a Rijksmonument, № 13087.

Description

Benninkmolen is what the Dutch call a "Stellingmolen". It is a two storey smock mill on a single store base. The smock and cap are covered in shingles. Winding is by tailpole and winch. The sails are Common sails. They are carried on a cast iron windshaft. The windshaft also carries the brake wheel, which has 51 cogs. This drives a wallower with 28 cogs, which is situated at the top of the upright shaft. At the bottom of the upright shaft is the great spur wheel, which has 80 cogs. This drives two pairs of  diameter French Burr millstones via lantern pinion stone nuts with 24 staves each.

Public access
Benninkmolen is open on Tuesday and Saturday from 09:00 to 12:00 and Friday from 11:00 to 16:00. It is also open at other times if a banner is flying, or by appointment.

References

Windmills in Gelderland
Windmills completed in 1921
Tower mills in the Netherlands
Grinding mills in the Netherlands
Agricultural buildings in the Netherlands
Rijksmonuments in Gelderland
Octagonal buildings in the Netherlands
Doetinchem
Towers completed in 1921